The Season of Fate (Traditional Chinese: 五味人生, literally The Five Flavors of Life) is a 2010 TVB television drama from Hong Kong produced by Nelson Cheung.

Synopsis
The poor Lin Sheung-Chun (Esther Kwan) was sold into the Kwan family as a concubine to help pay off her father's gambling debts. However, on the night of her marriage, her husband died. Hearing her screams, Wang Yeuk-Lam (Michelle Yim), the first wife, rushes in. Seeing her husband's dead body, she assumes Sheung-Chun is the murderer and tries to stab her, hitting her head on a table in the process. Ever since, Yeuk-Lam believes that she is a young girl, and that Sheung-Chun is her mother. She  has no memories of her previous life.

Since her husband is dead, and Yuek-Lam is no longer mentally stable, Sheung-Chun becomes the manager of the family bistro. There she works with her close childhood friend Leung Kau-Miu (Derek Kok). After ten long years of working hard to earn a living, Sheung-Chun finds that the bistro no longer attracts as many customers as it used to.

At this time, con-artist Ma Wing-Ching (Roger Kwok) and his apprentice Lai Shi-Mui (Regen Cheung) arrive in town. The two survive using cunning, wits, and lies. They pretend to be people of Yam Fei-Yeung (Lawrence Ng Wai-Kwok), a wealthy and well-known business tycoon, to get free stuff. When the pair swindle money from Sheung-Chun's bistro, she hunts down Wing-Ching and punches him, leaving him with a black eye. Thus, the rivalry between the two begin. Wing-Ching takes every available opportunity to take advantage of the Kwan family's kindness, but Sheung-Chun knows better and time and time again punishes him for his schemes.

When the rich Yam Shing-Tin (Oscar Leung), comes into town, Wing-Ching tricks him into believing that he is indebted to him. The two become good friends and Shing-Tin makes Wing-Ching his right-hand man. Shing-Tin soon falls for a girl named Wong Kam-Fung (Vivien Yeo), and Wing-Ching is secretly behind the curtains, humorously coaching both of them. The two start out pretending that they like each other in order to get back at the other person, but then they realize that they may have actually fallen in love with each other.

Meanwhile, Yeuk-Lam mistakes Wing-Ching for his father, believing that Wing-Ching is her senior apprentice. She finds herself slowly remembering her old life. Her memory is gradually restored, especially by the reappearance of Yam Fei-Yeung, Shing-Tin's father, who is actually Yeuk-Lam's second apprentice. One night, in an attempt to make her remember her old life, Wing-Ching pretends to be executed and brings back Yeuk-Lam's memories. When she wakes up, she is confused because to her, Sheung-Chun is an evil person who killed her husband, while to everyone else who knows her, she is a kind lady who works hard for her family. Yeuk-Lam decides to pretend she is still mental until she can uncover Sheung-Chun's true disposition.

Eventually, Wing-Ching, Sheung-Chun, and Kau-Miu discover that they were childhood friends during the time of the Qing Dynasty. The three make a heartfelt reunion and Wing-Ching begins to change for the better. Slowly, Wing-Ching and Sheung-Chun start to fall in love. Kau-Miu secretly harbors feelings for Sheung-Chun, but decides that he should be happy for her now that she has found her true love.

In the end, the true, nightmarish face of Yam Fei-Yeung is revealed. Together, the characters must stand together and they soon begin to truly understand the five flavors of life. The sweet, happy times, the sour and sad times, the bitter times, the spicy, exciting times, and the salty, difficult times.

Cast
Lin family

Yam family
{|class="wikitable" width="55%"
|- style="background:cornflowerblue; color:white" align=center
|style="width:25%"|Cast||style="width:30%"|Role||Description
|-
| Lawrence Ng(伍衛國) || Yam Fei-Yeung任飛揚 || Kwan's husband  Tin's father
|-
| Elena Kong || Tse Yuen-Kwan謝婉君 || Yeung's wife and Tin's mother.
|-
| Oscar Leung(梁烈唯) || Yam Shing-Tin任勝天 || Yeung's son.  Wong Kam Fung's lover  Ma Wing Ching's biological younger brother
|-
|}Kwan familyOther castViewership ratings

Awards and nominationsTVB Anniversary Awards (2010)' Nominated: Best Drama
 Nominated: Best Actor (Roger Kwok)
 Nominated: Best Actress (Michelle Yim)

References

External links
TVB.com The Season of Fate - Official Website 
K for TVB The Season of Fate'' - Series Synopsis 

TVB dramas
2010 Hong Kong television series debuts
2010 Hong Kong television series endings